GMH may refer to:

 Gandhi Medical College, in Hyderabad, India
 General Mediterranean Holding, a Luxembourg holding company
 General Motors railway station, Melbourne, Australia
 Georgian Manganese Holding
 Gibraltar Medallion of Honour
 GivesMeHope, a user-generated blog website
 GMH railway station, Elizabeth South, South Australia
 Gray matter hyperintensity
 Guam Memorial Hospital
 Holden, the Australian car making division of General Motors
 Middle High German language